For information on all University of San Diego sports, see San Diego Toreros

The San Diego Toreros football program is the intercollegiate American football team for the University of San Diego located in the U.S. state of California. The team competes in the NCAA Division I Football Championship Subdivision (FCS) and are members of the Pioneer Football League. San Diego's first football team was fielded in 1956. The team plays its home games at the Torero Stadium in San Diego, California. The Toreros are coached by Dale Lindsey.

History

Classifications
 1973–1992: NCAA Division III
 1993–present: NCAA Division I-AA/FCS

Conference memberships
 1956–1972: Independent
 1973–1992: NCAA Division III independent
 1993–present: Pioneer Football League

Rivalries

Cal Poly

San Diego Toreros and Cal Poly have a regional rivalry, both schools are in-state FCS opponents but not in the same conferences.

Notable former players
Notable alumni include:
Jamal Agnew
Eric Bakhtiari
Ross Dwelley
Michael Gasperson
Evan Hlavacek
Josh Johnson
Matt Maslowski
John Matthews
Vern Valdez
Ken Zampese
Dave Dunn

Year-by-year results

Championships

Conference championships 

† Co-champions

Divisional championships
From 2001–2005, the Pioneer Football League was divided into North and South Divisions. As winners of the Pioneer Football League's North Division, San Diego has made one appearance in the Pioneer Football League Championship Game, in 2005. The Toreros also shared the Division title with Valparaiso in 2003, but the tie-breaker allowed the Crusaders to represent the division in the championship game.

Playoff appearances

NCAA Division I FCS
San Diego has made five appearances in the FCS playoffs. Their overall record is 2–5.

NCAA Division III
The Toreros made one appearances in the NCAA Division III football playoffs, with a combined record of 0-1.

References

External links
 

 
American football teams established in 1956
1956 establishments in California